Trogulidae is a family of harvestmen with 5 genera and 57 extant species and one fossil species.

Members of this species have short legs and live in soil. They have dirt attached to their bodies, to escape predators. Their body length ranges from 2 to 22 mm. The body is in most genera somewhat flattened and leathery. Adults have a small hood, which hides their short chelicerae and pedipalps.

Distribution
Members of this family occur in western and southern Europe, up to western North Africa and the Levant, the Caucasus and northern Iran. Trogulus tricarinatus, a predator of terrestrial snails, has been introduced to eastern North America.

Name
The derivation of the name of the type genus, Trogulus, is not fully understood. The describer Latreille wrote that he named it because it looks like a monkshood. Perrier (1929) however derived the name from Ancient Greek trogein "gnawing", because of the rough, "gnawed-upon" appearance.

SpeciesChemeris, A.N. (2013) Two new harvestman species (Arachnida: Opiliones) from the collection of Siberian Zoological Museum. Arthropoda Selecta
 Anarthrotarsus Silhavý, 1967
 Anarthrotarsus martensi Silhavý, 1967

 Anelasmocephalus Simon, 1879

Anelasmocephalus balearicus Martens & Chemini, 1988 (Baleares)
Anelasmocephalus brignolii Martens & Chemini, 1988 (Sardinia)
Anelasmocephalus calcaneatus Martens & Chemini, 1988 (Sicily)
Anelasmocephalus cambridgei (Westwood, 1874) (Europe)
Anelasmocephalus crassipes (H. Lucas, 1847) (Algeria)
Anelasmocephalus hadzii Martens, 1978 (Austria)
Anelasmocephalus lycosinus (Sørensen, 1873) (Italy)
Anelasmocephalus osellai Martens & Chemini, 1988 (Italy)
Anelasmocephalus pusillus Simon, 1879 (Corsica, Sardinia)
Anelasmocephalus pyrenaicus Martens, 1978 (Spain)
Anelasmocephalus rufitarsis Simon, 1879 (France)
Anelasmocephalus tenuiglandis Martens & Chemini, 1988 (France)
Anelasmocephalus tuscus Martens & Chemini, 1988 (Italy)

 Calathocratus Simon, 1879

Calathocratus africanus (H. Lucas, 1847) (southern Europe, Algeria)
Calathocratus beieri Gruber, 1968
Calathocratus caucasicus (Šilhavý, 1966)
Calathocratus hirsutus Snegovaya, 2011
Calathocratus intermedius Roewer, 1940 (Crete)
Calathocratus kyrghyzicus (Chemeris, 2013)
Calathocratus minutus Snegovaya, 2011
Calathocratus rhodiensis (Gruber, 1963)
Calathocratus singularis (Roewer, 1940)
Calathocratus sinuosus (Sørensen, 1873)

 Konfiniotis Roewer, 1940
 Konfiniotis creticus Roewer, 1940 (Crete)

 Trogulus Latreille, 1802

Trogulus aquaticus Simon, 1879
Trogulus balearicus Schönhofer & Martens, 2008
Trogulus banaticus Avram, 1971
Trogulus cisalpinus Chemini & Martens, 1988 (Italy)
Trogulus closanicus Avram, 1971
Trogulus coriziformis C. L. Koch, in Hahn & C .L. Koch 1839 (southern Europe, Algeria)
Trogulus cristatus Simon, 1879
Trogulus falcipenis Komposch, 1999 (Austria)
Trogulus graecus Dahl, 1903 (Greece)
Trogulus gypseus Simon, 1879 (Israel, Egypt)
 † Trogulus longipes Haupt, 1956 (fossil: Eocene)
Trogulus hirtus Dahl, 1903 (Hercegovina)
Trogulus huberi Schönhofer & Martens, 2008
Trogulus karamanorum Schönhofer & Martens, 2009
Trogulus lusitanicus Giltay, 1932 (Portugal)
Trogulus martensi Chemini, 1983 (Italy)
Trogulus megaligrava Schönhofer et al., 2013
Trogulus melitensis Schönhofer & Martens, 2009
Trogulus nepaeformis (Scopoli, 1763) (southern Europe)
Trogulus oltenicus Avram, 1971
Trogulus ozimeci Schönhofer et al., 2013
Trogulus pharensis Schönhofer & Martens, 2009
Trogulus prietoi Schönhofer & Martens, 2008
Trogulus pyrenaicus Schönhofer & Martens, 2008
Trogulus rossicus Šilhavý, 1968
Trogulus setosissimus Roewer, 1940 (Crete)
Trogulus squamatus C. L. Koch, in Hahn & C .L .Koch 1839 (Dalmatia)
Trogulus tenuitarsus Schönhofer et al., 2013
Trogulus thaleri Schönhofer & Martens, 2009
Trogulus tingiformis C.L. Koch, in Hahn & C. L. Koch 1839
Trogulus torosus Simon, 1885 (Dalmatia)
Trogulus tricarinatus (Linnaeus, 1758) (central Europe)
Trogulus uncinatus Gruber, 1973

Footnotes

References
 Joel Hallan's Biology Catalog: Trogulidae
  (eds.) (2007): Harvestmen - The Biology of Opiliones. Harvard University Press 

Harvestmen
Arachnids of Africa
Arachnids of Asia
Harvestman families